Belarus used the postage stamps of the Soviet Union from 1917 to 1991.

In 1991 Belarus became an independent nation and began its own postal administration in 1992.

Republic of Belarus
Belarus' first issue (1992–1994) worth 30, 45, and 50 cents was put into circulation on 21 December 1992. In 1993 he was additionally issued stamps in 1, 2, 3, 5, 10, 15, and 25 rubles with the date "1992" and the 50, 100, and 150 rubles, with the date "1993" in the 1994 stamps were issued in 200, 300, 600, 1000 and 3000 rubles. The basis of the composition marks the first standard-issue was the national emblem of the sample 19 September 1991. The following are known overprints on stamps of the first standard production: overprint new face on stamps in 1992 (in 1994 and 1997.) And overlay the denomination ("A" and "B"), made in 1996.

In connection with the national emblem change, in 1995, it was carried out of the second issue of stamps Standard Edition par 180, 280, and 600 rubles, which was replaced by the coat of arms of view Victory Square in Minsk. In 1996 he was also released an additional mark of this release is 200 rubles (dated 1995). The 2001 edition marks the second part of the standard-issue was overprinted new value (1000 rubles).

Stamps third standard issue with the image of the sample 14 May 1995's emblem was issued in 1996–1997. In 1996 were produced in the mark 100, 200, 500, 600, 1000, 1500, 1800, 2200, 3300, 5000, 10.000, 30.000 and 50.000 RR. In 1997, the issue of stamps was carried out (with the date 1996), and 2000 worth 400 rubles and the mark of 1,500 rubles (also with the date 1996) was released in the changed color (blue instead of pink.) Later stamps were issued in this issue worth 800, 2,500, and 3,000 rubles, with the date "1997." The 2001 edition marks the second part of the standard-issue was overprinted new value (400 rubles).

Mark of the fourth standard issue was issued from 1998 to 2003. The main motive of the series was "ethnographic subjects." Often, due to inflation, the plot marks a nominal duplicated. Belarus story in the $100 registration in 1998 ("Watermill") was repeated on the mark of 30,000 rubles in the 1999 year. In 1998, the stamps were issued of 100, 200, 500, 1000, 1500, 2000, 3000, 3200, 5000, 5300 and 10,000 rubles. In 1999, Belarus released par 800, 30,000, 50,000, 100,000 and 500,000 rubles. 1 January 2000 years after the denomination in circulation began to enter the fourth-grade standard issue in the new prices scale. In 2000, the stamps were issued in 1, 2, 3, 5, 10, 20, 30, 50, and 100 rubles, and lettering denomination (A and B). In 2001, the stamps were issued in 100, 200, 500 rubles, and the overlay of the new face (1000 rubles) on the mark of $100 in 1998. In 2002 Belarus re-released in 1, 2, 3, 5, 10, 20, 30, 50 rubles and lettered denomination (A and B). In 2003 Belarus re-released in 200 and 500 rubles.

Mark, the fifth standard issue, was issued from 2002 to 2007. The main motive was the image of landmarks (except the 1000-ruble mark, which depicted a personal coat of arms Skarina). In 2002, the face value of stamps was issued in 1000, 2000, 3000, 5000 rubles and lettered with the nominal value image (H, C). In 2006, the mark of 3,000 rubles was reissued with a changed pattern in the new color. In 2007 Belarus re-released 2000 rubles.

Sixth Standard Edition ("flowers," square format) was implemented in 2002 and represented Belarus' stamps in 200, 500 rubles, and the denomination of the lettered (A, B, C, D).

Stamps seventh standard issue with the image of berries was issued in 2004. The series was presented brands in 5, 10, 20, 30, 50, 100, 200, 300, 500, 1,000 rubles and lettered nominal value designation (A, B, C, N, P).

Also, in 2004, have been released and marks the eighth standard issue ("wild trees"), presented in denominations of 100, 200, 300, 400, 500, and 1000 rubles, and the denomination of the lettered (A, B, C, H, P ).

In 2006, the standard was implemented ninth edition ("Bird"), submitted to the marks of 10, 20, 30, 50, 100, 200, 300, 500, 1,000 rubles and lettered designation of nominal value (A, B, and H).

In 2007, the stamps were issued tenth standard issue ("beasts," the format of the diamond) with lettering denomination (A and B). Each brand was introduced in two design options.

The same theme was repeated in the eleventh grades Standard Edition (2008), presented in denominations of 10, 200, 300, 400, 1,000, and 5,000 rubles. In contrast to the 2007 edition of the brand in 2008 was the "book" format.

Also, in 2008 was conducted emission marks the twelfth standard issue ("flowers," "book" format) with face value 20, 30, 50, 100, 500 rubles, and the denomination of the lettered (A, B and H).

In January 2012, has been implemented emission standard marks the thirteenth issue ("national pattern") with lettering denomination (M and N). In March 2012, the sales will go mark the fourteenth Standard Edition ("monuments"), par 50, 100, 200, 500, 1,000, 2,000, 5,000, 10,000, 20,000 rubles and lettered designation of nominal value (A, H and P). The first release of these brands is different from the re-issue of their (second half of 2012 – the beginning of 2013), the type used in the paper they are printed.

Currently (2012), for frank postings are valid the following standard grades of Belarus: brand first standard-issue overprinted a literal face value (A and B, 1996), marks a second standard-issue overprinted new value (1000 rubles, 2001 ), marks the third standard-issue overprinted new value (400 rubles, 2001), as well as the brand of the fourth and subsequent editions issued after 2000 (including $100 in 1998 with an overprint of new value, implemented in 2001 g) except for grades of 1, 2, 3 and 5 rubles.

In February 2019, four commemorative stamps were released for the 2019 European Games, to be held in Minsk in June that year.

Sources

See also 
 Belpochta

External links
 Official site
 Belarus stamp gallery

Communications in Belarus
Belarus
Cultural history of Belarus